Sir Alexander Galloway Erskine Erskine-Hill, 1st Baronet (3 April 1894 – 6 June 1947) was a Scottish Unionist Party politician.

He was member of parliament (MP) for Edinburgh North from 1935 to 1945.

He was originally a Liberal, contesting North Lanark for that party in 1918, but identified with the Unionists by 1928, speaking at a large number of party meetings. At the time of his election in Edinburgh North he was Advocate Deputy to the Lord Advocate and the standing junior counsel to the Department of Agriculture in Scotland.

He was created a baronet of Quothquhan in the County of Lanark on 22 June 1945.

References

External links 
 

1894 births
1947 deaths
Chairmen of the 1922 Committee
Unionist Party (Scotland) MPs
Baronets in the Baronetage of the United Kingdom
Members of the Parliament of the United Kingdom for Edinburgh constituencies
UK MPs 1935–1945
Scottish Liberal Party parliamentary candidates
Alexander